The 2015 Pac-12 Conference women's basketball tournament  was the postseason women's basketball tournament at KeyArena in Seattle, Washington from March 5–8, 2015.

Seeds
Teams were seeded by conference record, with ties broken by record between the tied teams followed by record against the regular-season champion, if necessary.

Schedule

Thursday-Sunday, March 5–8, 2014

The top four seeds received a first-round bye.

Bracket

All-Tournament Team
Source:

Most Outstanding Player

See also
2015 Pac-12 Conference men's basketball tournament

References

2014–15 Pac-12 Conference women's basketball season
2015 in sports in Washington (state)
Basketball competitions in Seattle
Women's sports in Washington (state)
2015 in Seattle
College basketball tournaments in Washington (state)